Michael Allan Budnik, Jr. (born August 8, 1974) is an American mixed martial artist and former professional in-line skater. He competed in the first ten X-Games.

Budnik has been a resident of Sparta Township, New Jersey.

MMA career
Budnik built up an undefeated 6–0 record fighting close to home before being invited to compete in WEC. He made his debut for the organization on August 3, 2008 at WEC 35 against Greg McIntyre. He won the bout by pulling off a submission due to triangle choke in the third round.

In his next bout he would face collegiate wrestling champion and fellow Oklahoman Shane Roller. Budnik lost via guillotine choke in the first round.

Budnik competed in a notable fight against UFC veteran Rich Clementi, which he lost due to rear naked choke in the 5th round. Budnik has made it on The Ultimate Fighter 12. Budnik was eliminated on the first episode of The Ultimate Fighter by Nam Phan by 1st-round TKO due to a liver shot and punches.

Budnik fought again on July 17, 2010 against UFC Vet Anthony Macias and won the fight in the second round by submission due to an arm triangle choke to improve his record to 9–4.
After recent wins over Scrap Pak fighter and Bellator and Strikeforce Vet Johnny Carson, Miletich fighter Brandon Adamson and winning the Combat MMA 155 lb. title over rising Oklahoma star Jesse Chaffin, Budnik's winning streak has reached 6 in a row.

Mixed martial arts record

|-
| Win
| align=center| 14–4
| Jesse Chaffin
| TKO (punches)
| CMMA: Combat MMA
| 
| align=center| 2
| align=center| 2:30
| Tulsa, Oklahoma, United States
| 
|-
| Win
| align=center| 13–4
| Brandon Adamson
| Submission (guillotine choke)
| XFO 44: Xtreme Fighting Organization 44
| 
| align=center| 1
| align=center| 4:30
| Chicago, Illinois, United States
| 
|-
| Win
| align=center| 12–4
| Jonny Carson
| Submission (rear-naked choke)
| Xtreme Fight Night 2: Harris vs. Head
| 
| align=center| 3
| align=center| 1:15
| Tulsa, Oklahoma, United States
| 
|-
| Win
| align=center| 11–4
| William Black
| Decision 
| C3 Fights: Knockout-Rockout Weekend 6 
| 
| align=center| 3
| align=center| 5:00
| Concho, Oklahoma, United States
| 
|-
| Win
| align=center| 10–4
| Mario Stapel
| Decision 
| C3 Fights: Knockout-Rockout Weekend 5 
| 
| align=center| 3
| align=center| 5:00
| Concho, Oklahoma, United States
| 
|-
| Win
| align=center| 9–4
| Anthony Macias
| Submission (arm-triangle choke)
| C3 Fights: Knockout-Rockout Weekend 4 
| 
| align=center| 2
| align=center| 1:30
| Clinton, Oklahoma, United States
| 
|-
| Loss
| align=center| 8–4
| Rich Clementi
| Submission (rear-naked choke)
| 5150 Combat League/XFL: New Year's Revolution
| 
| align=center| 5
| align=center| 2:10
| Bixby, Oklahoma, United States
| 
|-
| Win
| align=center| 8–3
| Ryan Bixler
| Decision (split) 
| C3: Slammin Jammin Weekend 1
| 
| align=center| 3
| align=center| 3:00
| Newkirk, Oklahoma, United States
| 
|-
| Loss
| align=center| 7–3
| Rafael Dias
| Decision (unanimous)
| WEC 40
| 
| align=center| 3
| align=center| 5:00
| Chicago, Illinois, United States
| 
|-
| Loss
| align=center| 7–2
| John Franchi
| Decision (split)
| WEC 39
| 
| align=center| 3
| align=center| 5:00
| Corpus Christi, Texas, United States
| 
|-
| Loss
| align=center| 7–1
| Shane Roller
| Submission (guillotine choke)
| WEC 37: Torres vs. Tapia
| 
| align=center| 1
| align=center| 1:01
| Las Vegas, Nevada, United States
| 
|-
| Win
| align=center| 7–0
| Greg McIntyre
| Submission (triangle choke)
| WEC 35: Condit vs. Miura
| 
| align=center| 3
| align=center| 3:21
| Las Vegas Valley|Las Vegas, Nevada, United States
| 
|-
| Win
| align=center| 6–0
| Dustin Phillips
| Submission (guillotine choke)
| Extreme Fighting League
| 
| align=center| 1
| align=center| 2:06
| Tulsa, Oklahoma, United States
| 
|-
| Win
| align=center| 5–0
| Tim Estes
| Submission (triangle choke)
| Extreme Fighting League
| 
| align=center| 2
| align=center| 0:51
| Miami, Oklahoma, United States
| 
|-
| Win
| align=center| 4–0
| Kenny Giddens
| KO (punch)
| EFL: Xtreme Fight Night
| 
| align=center| 1
| align=center| 1:07
| Catoosa, Oklahoma, United States
| 
|-
| Win
| align=center| 3–0
| Ryan Robinson
| TKO
| ICS: Cage Rage
| 
| align=center| 1
| align=center| 2:19
| Tulsa, Oklahoma, United States
| 
|-
| Win
| align=center| 2–0
| Johnny Flores
| Decision (split)
| KOTC: Jawbreaker
| 
| align=center| 2
| align=center| N/A
| Oklahoma, United States
| 
|-
| Win
| align=center| 1–0
| Josh Pulsifer
| Submission (triangle choke)
| EFL: Battle at the Buffalo Run
| 
| align=center| 2
| align=center| 0:44
| Oklahoma, United States
|

References

External links
 

1974 births
Living people
Sportspeople from Brooklyn
People from Sparta, New Jersey
American male mixed martial artists
Mixed martial artists from New York (state)
Lightweight mixed martial artists
Aggressive inline skaters